List of one-club men may refer to:

 List of one-club men in association football
 List of one-club men in rugby league
 List of Major League Baseball players who spent their entire career with one franchise
 List of NBA players who have spent their entire career with one franchise
 List of NHL players who spent their entire career with one franchise